Władysław Baka (24 March 1936 – 3 March 2021) was a Polish economist, politician, and banker.

Biography
He obtained a doctoral degree in 1971, became an associate professor in 1977, and a full professor in 1989.

In 1955, Baka joined the Polish United Workers' Party and served on its Central Committee. From 1972 to 1973, he headed the committee's propaganda department and subsequently worked in its economic departments. From 1981 to 1985, he was a Minister without Portfolio in the Council of Ministers, where he helped to plan economic reform. From 1985 to 1988 and 1989 to 1991, he was President of the National Bank of Poland. He represented the communist government for their social and economic policy in the 1989 Polish Round Table Agreement. He also served on the Consultative Council of the Polish Council of State's chairman. He represented Poland at the World Bank in the late 1980s. He unsuccessfully ran for the Sejm in 1989.

In 2005, President Aleksander Kwaśniewski awarded Baka the Grand Cross of the Order of Polonia Restituta "in recognition of his outstanding contribution to the development of the financial system in Poland, for achievements in research and teaching". He had previously been awarded the Order's Knight's Cross, Commander's Cross, and the Commander's Cross with Star.

Władysław Baka died on 3 March 2021 at the age of 84.

References

Polish United Workers' Party members
Polish bankers
20th-century Polish economists
1936 births
2021 deaths
Government ministers of Poland
Governors of the National Bank of Poland
University of Warsaw alumni
Academic staff of the University of Warsaw
Grand Crosses of the Order of Polonia Restituta
21st-century Polish economists